The Sarasota Sun Sox were a minor league baseball team based in Sarasota, Florida that played in the Florida State League from 1961 to 1965. They were affiliated with the Kansas City Athletics in 1961 and the Chicago White Sox from 1962 to 1965.

Year-by-year record

References

Baseball teams established in 1961
Defunct Florida State League teams
Sports in Sarasota County, Florida
Chicago White Sox minor league affiliates
Kansas City Athletics minor league affiliates
Defunct baseball teams in Florida
Sports clubs disestablished in 1965
1961 establishments in Florida
1965 disestablishments in Florida
Baseball teams disestablished in 1965